Michael Ojemudia (born September 12, 1997) is an American football cornerback for the Chicago Bears of the National Football League (NFL). He played college football at Iowa.

College career
Playing high school football at Harrison High School in Farmington Hills, Michigan, Ojemudia committed to Iowa as a linebacker on January 28, 2015, choosing the Hawkeyes over Indiana, Wyoming and Eastern Michigan, who all offered scholarships. Ojemudia was trying to chase in-state scholarship offers from Michigan and Michigan State, but they never came.

After redshirting his freshman year at Iowa, the coaching staff moved Ojemudia from safety to cornerback. Ojemudia played in every game as a redshirt freshman. He broke into the starting lineup occasionally during his sophomore season, and improved his play after a midseason benching. and junior season. He moved into a permanent starting role during his senior season. After his senior season, Ojemudia participated in the 2020 Senior Bowl and 2020 NFL Combine.

Professional career
Ojemudia declared for the 2020 NFL Draft after his senior season at Iowa.  He received an invitation to participate in the Senior Bowl and the NFL Combine.  Initially, Ojemudia was not high on many experts' draft boards, but he stood out in the Senior Bowl and increased his draft stock.  On March 1, 2020, Ojemudia participated in the NFL Combine.  He recorded a 4.45-second 40-yard dash, a 4.21-second 20-yard shuttle time, a 6.87-second cone drill time, and a 36-inch vertical jump among others, as shown in the table below.  He also measured in at 6'0" and 200 lbs., with a 32-inch arm span and an 8-inch hand span.  At the end of the pre-draft process, most draft experts ultimately projected Ojemudia as a second-round to fifth-round prospect.

Denver Broncos
Ojemudia was taken in the third round (77th overall) by the Denver Broncos in the 2020 NFL Draft.

2020 season: Rookie year
Heading into his first training camp in the NFL, Ojemudia was a starting cornerback alongside veterans A. J. Bouye and Bryce Callahan.  He faced minor competition for his job from third-year veteran Isaac Yiadom.  At the conclusion of the Broncos' training camp, head coach Vic Fangio officially named Ojemudia the starting right cornerback in the Broncos’ nickel defense.

Ojemudia made his first career start and NFL debut in the Broncos’ season-opening loss to the Tennessee Titans.  He intercepted a pass in Week 1 that was negated by an unnecessary roughness penalty.
In Week 6 of the 2020 season against the New England Patriots, Ojemudia recorded his first career forced fumble on tight end Ryan Izzo which was recovered by the Broncos during the 18–12 win.
In Week 15 against the Buffalo Bills, Ojemudia was ejected after punching Bills' wide receiver Gabe Davis.  
In Week 17 against the Las Vegas Raiders, Ojemudia forced two fumbles that were both recovered by the Broncos defense during the 32–31 loss.

Ojemudia finished his rookie season appearing in all 16 games (11 starts) recording 62 combined tackles, six passes defended, and four forced fumbles while playing in 78% of the defensive snaps.

2021 season
Entering his second training camp in the NFL, Ojemudia was slated to be the fourth cornerback on the depth chart, behind free-agent additions Kyle Fuller and Ronald Darby and incumbent veteran Bryce Callahan.  During preseason, however, he was surpassed on the depth chart by first-round rookie Patrick Surtain II.  At the conclusion of the preseason, head coach Vic Fangio named Ojemudia the fifth cornerback on the depth chart, behind Kyle Fuller, Ronald Darby, Bryce Callahan, and Patrick Surtain II.

On September 1, 2021, Ojemudia was placed on injured reserve to start the season. He was activated on December 11.

On January 2 in the Broncos' Week 17 loss to the Los Angeles Chargers, Ojemudia appeared in 15% of the team's defensive snaps as he worked his way back from injury.  The following week in the Broncos' season finale against the Kansas City Chiefs, Ojemudia made his first and only start of the season alongside Kyle Fuller and Bryce Callahan.  He had a stellar performance that week, recording eight solo tackles, two passes defensed, and almost notching two interceptions against Patrick Mahomes.  Overall, Ojemudia finished his sophomore season appearing in 2 games (1 start) and recording eight tackles and two passes defensed while appearing in 59% of the team's defensive snaps over the two games he played in.

2022 season
Heading into the 2022 offseason and training camp, Ojemudia competed for a starting cornerback job against Ronald Darby.  At the conclusion of the preseason, head coach Nathaniel Hackett named Ojemudia the fourth cornerback on the depth chart to begin the season, behind Patrick Surtain II, Ronald Darby, and K'Waun Williams. On August 31, Ojemudia was placed on injured reserve to begin the season. He was activated on October 17. He was waived on December 27, 2022.

Chicago Bears
On December 28, 2022, Ojemudia was claimed off waivers by the Chicago Bears.

Career statistics

Regular season

Personal life
Ojemudia's father, Dennis, was born in Nigeria but later moved to the United States and works as an engineer for Ford Motor Company. Michael, a mechanical engineering major at Iowa, also plans to work in the auto industry once his football career is over. Michael's older brother, Mario, played college football at Michigan and currently works as a corporate partnerships associate for the Denver Broncos.

Ojemudia was an all-state track athlete in the 110-meter hurdles in high school.

References

External links
Iowa Hawkeyes bio

1997 births
Living people
African-American players of American football
American sportspeople of Nigerian descent
Players of American football from Michigan
Sportspeople from Oakland County, Michigan
People from Farmington Hills, Michigan
American football cornerbacks
Iowa Hawkeyes football players
Denver Broncos players
Chicago Bears players
21st-century African-American sportspeople